= Sarmatova Garden =

Historical site in Taganrog, Russia

- Сад Сарматовой (Russian)
- Location within Russia
- Type: Garden
- Location: Italyansky Lane Taganrog, Rostov oblast Russia

History
- Built: the first quarter of the 20th century

Site notes
- Architect: A. S. Sarmatova

Sarmatova Garden (Russian: Сад Сарматовой) was a place of cultural rest for the citizens in Taganrog, which was created in the first quarter of the 20th century. The founder of the summer garden was Madame A. S. Sarmatova. It was located in the Italyansky lane.

== History ==
Between the corner house located along the Greek street and the house number 3 in the Italyansky lane of Taganrog, there was a summer garden. It has been one of the places of cultural rest for the inhabitants of the city for decades.

Initially, in this location, Madame Sarmatova opened a small theater. It is a small area consisting of two terraces. The foreigners, local officers and lawyers came to view the entertainment in the summer garden of Sarmatova. For a time the Civil war caused the garden to close, but it reopened. In the late 1930s, the stage in the Sarmatova's garden was on the top terrace, which was parallel to the Italyansky lane.

The hostel of the Pedagogical Institute is now located on the upper terrace. On the lower terrace there are now cafes, a restaurant, a fountain, bushes, graveled paths.
